A silent butler, sometimes called an ash butler, is a small container, often of base metal, sometimes silver or silverplate, with a handle and hinged cover, used for collecting ashes or crumbs. They were more common prior to the modern period, and enjoyed some popularity being made as a home construction project in the US. They are now often considered collector's items, or are valued for their retro appeal.

References

Cleaning tools
Metalworking